Hillesheim is a former Verbandsgemeinde ("collective municipality") in the district Vulkaneifel, in Rhineland-Palatinate, Germany. The seat of the Verbandsgemeinde was in Hillesheim. In January 2019 it was merged into the Verbandsgemeinde Gerolstein.

The Verbandsgemeinde Hillesheim consisted of the following Ortsgemeinden ("local municipalities"):

Basberg 
Berndorf 
Dohm-Lammersdorf 
Hillesheim
Kerpen 
Nohn 
Oberbettingen 
Oberehe-Stroheich 
Üxheim 
Walsdorf 
Wiesbaum

Former Verbandsgemeinden in Rhineland-Palatinate